Zhenniao or sometimes translated as Zhen or Poisonfeather Birds is a name given to poisonous birds that are said to have existed in what is now Southern China during ancient times and is referenced in many Chinese myths, annals, and poetry. The Shanhaijing Chapter 5: Classic of the Mountains: Central describes the Zhen as resembling an eagle living in Girl's Tabletop Mountain, Lutemute Mountain, and Jade Mountain in Southern China.

Historical and literary references
In Guo Pu's (郭璞) commentaries of the Shanhaijing, he describes this bird as having a purple abdomen and green-tipped feathers with a long neck and a scarlet beak. This bird acquires its poisonous attributes from devouring poisonous viper heads. The male in the species is called Revolving Sun and the female is called Yin Harmony.

More descriptions of the zhen birds are found in Guo Yigong's Extensive Records  – which was written in the 3rd century CE, later lost, yet still quoted in Guangyun – and Song dynasty's dictionary Piya: in those works, the zhen is described as being goose like, colored dark-purple, and having a beak 7‑8 cun long and copper-colored; from its very veins to the tips of its feathers, the zhen's body is said to be tainted with an unparalleled poison referred to as zhendu or zhen poison. The zhen's feathers were often dipped into liquor to create a poisonous draught that was often used to carry out assassinations. Its meat however was said to be overtly toxic and gave off a gamy odor that rendered it inadequate for surreptitious use and the zhen's excrement could dissolve stone. The zhen's poison was said to be so deadly that it needed only to pass through one's throat to kill a person. In the Baopuzi by Taoist adept Ge Hong, the only thing that was said to be able to neutralize the zhen's poison was the horn of Xiniu (犀牛) or the rhinoceros. Xiniu horns would be made into hairpins and when used to stir poisonous concoctions would foam and neutralize the poison.

Aside from the Shanhaijing, Guangzhi, Piya, and Baopuzi, an entry for the zhen also appears in the Sancai Tuhui along with a woodblock print. In the historical records of ancient China, references to the zhen are usually in the form of the idiom "Drinking zhen to quench one's thirst" or when comparing the zhendu to the poison from monkshood. The idiom is usually used to describe someone who merely considers the benefit for the time being and not contemplating the gravity of the consequence that his action will bring him. Such references include chapter "Duke Min's first year" in the Zuo Tradition:

The Rong and Di are like dholes and wolves and may not be satisfied; the various Xia states are close intimates and may not be abandoned. Ease and peace are like zhen's poison and may not be contemplated.

and "The Biography of Huo Xu" from the Book of the Later Han:

Would that not be like a person appeasing his hunger by eating monkshood, or quenching the thirst by drinking zhen′s poison? The person would die as soon as the poison entered his throat, way before they could make their way to his stomach to quench his hunger or thirst. How could [anyone] do such a thing?

In Chinese accounts, there are a number of mentions about zhendu poisoning used in failed and successful assassinations, but because "zhen" eventually became a metaphor for any type of poisoning in general, it is not always clear if the bird-poison was actually employed in each case. Various hagiographic sources allege that Wang Chuyi, a disciple of Wang Chongyang, was said to have been immune to poison and to have survived after drinking liquor containing poison from the zhen bird.

In the Japanese historical epic Taiheiki, Ashikaga Takauji and his brother Ashikaga Tadayoshi force Prince Morinaga to take zhendu (or chin doku as it's known in Japan). Tadayoshi later was himself captured and poisoned with zhendu.

Existence
Wild zhenniao were supposedly last seen in the Song dynasty when many farming Han Chinese moved to Guangdong and Guangxi. Humans are supposed to have killed them all. Chinese ornithologists have often theorized that the zhen was similar to the secretary bird or the crested serpent eagle (which happens to live in Southern China) and gained their toxicity from ingesting poisonous snakes, similar to how the poison dart frogs produce poison by ingesting poisonous insects. As a consequence, in some illustrated books, pictures very similar to these two birds have been used to depict the zhen.

However, throughout most modern history, zoologists knew of no poisonous birds and presumed the zhen to be a fabulous invention of the mind. But in 1992, an article was published in Science reporting that the hooded pitohui of New Guinea has poisonous feathers and since then a few other species of similarly poisonous birds have been discovered, most of which also gain their poison from their prey. A recent article in China has been published bringing up the question if the zhen bird could have really existed.

See also
Birds in Chinese mythology

Notes

References

External references

The Idiom "Drinking Zhen to quench one's thirst" (Chinese)
春秋左傳 - Chun Qiu Zuo Zhuan (Full Chinese text for the Biography of Qi Huan Gong)
太平記 (Full Japanese text for the Taiheiki)

Mythological and legendary Chinese birds
Yaoguai